Four ships of the United States Navy have been named USS Indianapolis:

  was a cargo ship commissioned 12 December 1918 and decommissioned 9 July 1919.
  was a heavy cruiser commissioned in 1932 and sunk in July 1945.
  was a Los Angeles-class attack submarine in service from 1980 to 1998.

See also
USS Indianapolis: Men of Courage, a 2016 film starring Nicolas Cage.

United States Navy ship names